Piutu, also known as piyutu or putu, is a traditional Filipino dish that is the staple food of the Sama-Bajau people of the Philippines and the east coast of Sabah. It is made from steamed cassava (panggi) that is mashed and shaped into cylinders or disks. They were traditionally wrapped in banana or palm leaves, but are commonly sold wrapped in clear plastic today. It is typically torn or cut into small disks for eating. It is not flavored and thus need to be eaten with another accompanying dish, usually seafood. The most popular accompaniments include latô salads, kima (giant clams), and siagol (a stew made from shark meat and turmeric). It serves as a replacement for rice, after the introduction of cassava to the Philippines from South America by the Spanish during the colonial period. 

Similar and related staple dishes are biamban and sianglag. Biamban (or bamban) is made from steamed tapioca flour cylinders wrapped in banana or palm leaves. Sianglag (also known as tompe, tompek, tinompeh, or anggang) is made from grated cassava that is fried until yellowish. Both also replace rice as an accompaniment to savory dishes.

See also
Pusô
Puto
Lontong
Kakanin

References

Philippine cuisine